James LeBlanc is an American actor.

LeBlanc grew up in South Boston, and was educated at St. Augustine's and Matignon High School in Cambridge. He has worked as a boxer and sheet metal worker.

Selected filmography
 Spotlight as Patrick McSorley (2015)
 Stronger as Larry (2017)
 Blood and Money as George (2020)

References

External links

Living people
American male film actors
American male television actors
21st-century American male actors
People from South Boston
Year of birth missing (living people)